Yancheng District is a district of the city of Luohe, Henan province, China.

Administrative divisions
As 2012, this district is divided to 1 subdistrict, 6 towns and 2 townships.
Subdistricts
Shabei Subdistrict

Towns

Townships
Heilongtan Township
Liji Township

References

County-level divisions of Henan
Luohe